Temple University Hospital (TUH) in Philadelphia, Pennsylvania is an academic medical center in the United States which is a part of the healthcare network Temple Health. It is the chief clinical training site for the Temple University School of Medicine. The hospital currently has a 722-bed capacity that offers comprehensive inpatient and outpatient services to the surrounding community, and highly specialized tertiary services in the Delaware Valley. In 2015, Temple University Hospital had more than 84,000 emergency department and 200,000 outpatient visits.

In August 2011, Becker's Hospital Review listed Temple University Hospital as number 10 on the 100 Top Grossing Hospitals in America with $5.9 billion in gross revenue.

History
It was originally the Samaritan Hospital which was founded by Russell Conwell and his congregation, Baptist Temple, on January 18, 1892 through the purchase of a three-story house at the intersection of Broad and Ontario St. The original hospital had twenty beds and only two full-time staff members. The hospital expanded with the addition of the Greathart Hospital as a maternity hospital and further facilities in the next decade after its founding. Samaritan Hospital was renamed to Temple University Hospital in 1929.

William Parkinson, who was appointed as the director of the hospital and Dean of School of Medicine in February 1929, oversaw its renovation and expansion to a 500-bed capacity by 1940. Development progressed in 1950s with the leadership of William Parkinson as three new buildings were added to accommodate the increasing number of individuals served by the hospital. A new ancillary and outpatient building were added along with Parkinson Pavilion, which added 600 inpatient beds. Further development came in December 1982 when a replacement hospital was approved on Broad and Ontario to replace the main hospital building with a 504-bed facility. The new nine-story hospital opened in 1986 with an expanded emergency department, while the Parkinson Pavilion was renovated to an outpatient facility.

Temple University Health System

Until 1994, Temple University and Temple University Hospital were one entity. Peter J. Liacouras, the president of Temple University at that time, and the board of trustees separated hospital-related activities with the creation of Temple University Health System (TUHS) as a private non-profit entity. Temple Health is a major Philadelphia-based academic health system that is driving medical advances through clinical innovation, pioneering research and world-class education. The health system’s 1,550+ physicians and scientists share a common mission of bringing tomorrow’s treatments to the bedside today, helping them achieve outcomes once thought impossible.

Specialties
Temple University Hospital has a number of specialties including Abdominal Organ Transplant Program, Bariatric Surgery Program, Bone Marrow transplant Program, Burn Center, Cancer Center, Digestive Disease Center, Heart and Vascular Institute, Lung Center, Neurosciences Center and Orthopaedics & Sports Medicine.

See also
Fox Chase Cancer Center
Temple University
Temple University School of Medicine

References

External links
Official website

1892 establishments in Pennsylvania
Hospitals established in 1892
Hospitals in Philadelphia
Nicetown-Tioga, Philadelphia
Temple University
Teaching hospitals in Pennsylvania
Trauma centers